The Dutch Eerste Divisie in the 1980–81 season was contested by 19 teams. HFC Haarlem won the championship.

New entrants
Relegated from the 1979–80 Eredivisie
 HFC Haarlem
 Vitesse Arnhem

League standings

Promotion competition
In the promotion competition, four period winners (the best teams during each of the four quarters of the regular competition) played for promotion to the eredivisie.

See also
 1980–81 Eredivisie
 1980–81 KNVB Cup

References
Netherlands - List of final tables (RSSSF)

Eerste Divisie seasons
2
Neth